HMS Sentinel was one of two  scout cruisers built for the Royal Navy in the first decade of the 20th century. The ship was initially assigned to the Mediterranean Fleet before returning home and being reduced to reserve in 1907. Recommissioned two years later as part of the Home Fleet, she spent the next five years moving on and off of active service in British waters. Sentinel was assigned to coastal defence duties when the First World War began in 1914, although she was transferred to the Mediterranean in 1915. By 1918 the ship had been assigned to the Aegean. After the end of the war in November, Sentinel was sent to the Black Sea as the British attempted to intervene in the Russian Civil War. The ship returned home in early 1919 and was paid off. She became a training ship from mid-1920 to the end of 1922 and was sold for scrap in early 1923.

Design and description
The Sentinel-class ships were one of four classes of scout cruisers ordered by the Admiralty in 1902–1903 and 1903–1904 Naval Programmes. These ships were intended to work with destroyer flotillas, leading their torpedo attacks and backing them up when attacked by other destroyers, although they quickly became less useful as destroyer speeds increased before the First World War. Their crew consisted of 289 officers and ratings.

The ships were powered by a pair of three-cylinder triple-expansion steam engines, each driving one shaft, using steam provided by a dozen Vickers Express water-tube boilers.

The main armament of the Sentinel class consisted of ten quick-firing (QF) 12-pounder  18-cwt guns. Three guns were mounted abreast on the forecastle and the quarterdeck, with the remaining four guns positioned port and starboard amidships. They also carried eight 3-pounder Hotchkiss guns and two above-water 18-inch (450 mm) torpedo tubes, one on each broadside.

Career
Sentinel was laid down by Vickers Limited at their shipyard in Barrow-in-Furness on 8 June 1903, launched on 19 April 1904 and completed in April 1905. She was originally to be named HMS Inchkeith, but was renamed in 1903, prior to launching. Not long after completion, two additional 12-pounder guns were added and the 3-pounder guns were replaced with six QF 6-pounder Hotchkiss guns. The ship began her career with the 3rd Cruiser Squadron in the Mediterranean in 1906, before being recalled to join the Channel Fleet, and then reduced to reserve in the Home Fleet from 1907. In February 1910 she was recommissioned as the leader of the 5th Destroyer Flotilla at Chatham and refitted there in June. About 1911–1912, her main guns were replaced by nine  guns, arranged four on each broadside and the remaining gun on the quarterdeck. After another refit in 1912 at HM Dockyard, Devonport, Sentinel was assigned to the 3rd Light Cruiser Squadron in 1913 for the annual manoeuvres and was then transferred to lead the 9th Destroyer Flotilla at Portsmouth. The ship joined the 6th Destroyer Flotilla at Dover later that year.

After the start of the First World War in August 1914, Sentinel was serving with the 8th Destroyer Flotilla in the Firth of Forth. In 1915 she was temporarily assigned with 6th Light Cruiser Squadron in the Humber to defend against Zeppelin raids, before she was transferred to the Mediterranean and then to the Aegean in 1918. Later that year, Sentinel was part of the squadron sent through the Dardanelles to undertake duties in the Black Sea, where Britain was becoming involved in the Russian Civil War. The ship paid off in April 1919 at Sheerness and served as a mechanic’s training ship at Chatham from July 1920 until the end of 1922 before being sold for scrap in January 1923.

Notes

Footnotes

Bibliography

External links
 
 Sentinel class in World War I
 History of the Sentinel class

 

Sentinel-class cruisers
World War I cruisers of the United Kingdom
1904 ships